Slavka Uzunova (born ) is a retired Bulgarian female volleyball player. 

She was part of the Bulgaria women's national volleyball team at the 1998 FIVB Volleyball Women's World Championship in Japan, and at the 2002 FIVB Volleyball Women's World Championship.

References

External links
http://www.fivb.ch/En/Volleyball/Competitions/WorldChampionships/Women/2002/Index.asp
http://www.gettyimages.com/photos/slavka-ouzounova-dimitrova?excludenudity=true&mediatype=photography&phrase=slavka%20ouzounova%20dimitrova&sort=mostpopular
http://www.fivb.org/EN/VolleyBall/Competitions/WorldChampionships/Women/2002/Photos/PhotoGallery.asp?No=063&Title=Bulgaria-China

1971 births
Living people
Bulgarian women's volleyball players
Wing spikers